Taizhou railway station is a railway station in Jiaojiang District, Taizhou, Zhejiang, China. It is an intermediate stop on the Hangzhou–Taizhou high-speed railway.

History
It was known as Taizhou Central railway station during construction. It was renamed to Taizhou railway station on 25 June 2021, coinciding with the opening of the Jinhua–Taizhou railway and the renaming of the old Taizhou railway station to Taizhou West.

The station opened with the Hangzhou–Taizhou high-speed railway on 8 January 2022.

Design 
The station has eight platforms arranged in four islands, with two bypass lines that pass through the middle of the station.

Metro Station 
Line S1 has opened at 28 December 2022.

Future Development
There will be a future interchange with Line S1 and Line S2 of the Taizhou Rail Transit.

References

Railway stations in China opened in 2022
Railway stations in Zhejiang